is a passenger railway station  located in the city of Odawara, Kanagawa Prefecture, Japan, operated by the private railway operator Odakyu Electric Railway.

Lines
Hotaruda Station is served by the Odakyu Odawara Line, and is located 79.2 kilometers from the line’s terminus at Shinjuku Station..

Station layout
Hotaruda Station has two opposed side platforms with three tracks, connected to the station building by a footbridge.

Platforms

History
Hotaruda Station opened on 1 April  1952.

Station numbering was introduced in January 2014 with Hotaruda being assigned station number OH45.

Passenger statistics
In fiscal 2019, the station was used by an average of 6,059 passengers daily.

The passenger figures for previous years are as shown below.

Surrounding area
Izumi Junior High School
Higashi Tomimizu Elementary School

See also
List of railway stations in Japan

References

External links

 Odakyu station information 

Railway stations in Kanagawa Prefecture
Railway stations in Japan opened in 1952
Odakyu Odawara Line
Railway stations in Odawara